In enzymology, a crotonoyl-[acyl-carrier-protein] hydratase is an enzyme that catalyzes the chemical reaction

(3R)-3-hydroxybutanoyl-[acyl-carrier-protein]  but-2-enoyl-[acyl-carrier-protein] + H2O

Hence, this enzyme has one substrate, [[(3R)-3-hydroxybutanoyl-[acyl-carrier-protein]]], and two products, [[but-2-enoyl-[acyl-carrier-protein]]] and H2O.

This enzyme belongs to the family of lyases, specifically the hydro-lyases, which cleave carbon-oxygen bonds.  The systematic name of this enzyme class is (3R)-3-hydroxybutanoyl-[acyl-carrier-protein] hydro-lyase (but-2-enoyl-[acyl-carrier protein]-forming). Other names in common use include (3R)-3-hydroxybutanoyl-[acyl-carrier-protein] hydro-lyase, beta-hydroxybutyryl acyl carrier protein dehydrase, beta-hydroxybutyryl acyl carrier protein (ACP) dehydrase, beta-hydroxybutyryl acyl carrier protein dehydrase, enoyl acyl carrier protein hydrase, crotonyl acyl carrier protein hydratase, 3-hydroxybutyryl acyl carrier protein dehydratase, beta-hydroxybutyryl acyl carrier, and protein dehydrase.  This enzyme participates in fatty acid biosynthesis.

References

 
 

EC 4.2.1
Enzymes of unknown structure